Passiflora indecora is a species of plant in the family Passifloraceae. It is found in Ecuador and possibly Peru.

References

indecora
Least concern plants
Taxonomy articles created by Polbot